Sousse Governorate is one of the twenty-four governorates (provinces) of Tunisia. It is beside the eastern coast of Tunisia in the north-east of the country and covers an area of 2,621 km2 and has a population of 674,971 (2014 census). The capital is Sousse.

Geography
The area compasses most of the broad eastern coastal plain (which has a hot Mediterranean climate) featuring salt and fresh water lakes, fed by winter rains. A narrow strip of forest, the Foret Nationale de Tunisie, adjoins part of the beach swathe between Sousse and Hammamet to the far north, the beach forming most of the coastline.  These cities are on the Gulf of Hammamet which is a gently-curved bay.  The largest lake is the Sebkhet de Sidi El Hani which is shared with two other areas but is mostly in the Sousse Governorate.

Elevations are pronounced in the second national park in the area, which is mainly in Nabeul Governorate, is on all of the seaward sides of Hammam Bent Djadidi adjoining the northern border.

Transport
Linked by the widest road in the country and railways to Tunis, the area has roads and railways leading further into the country and towards Libya as well as an airport beside the main port city of Sousse, Monastir Habib Bourguiba International Airport which is beyond its short eastern border in much smaller Monastir Governorate. There is a Metro line that goes from Sousse Beb Djedid threw Monastir to Mahdia.

Administrative divisions
The governorate is divided into sixteen delegations (mutamadiyat), listed below with their populations at the 2004 and 2014 Censuses:

Sixteen municipalities are in Sousse Governorate:

References

 
Governorates of Tunisia